Expert Opinion on Therapeutic Patents is a monthly peer-reviewed medical journal covering pharmaceutical patent information across all therapy areas. Each review includes an "expert opinion" section, in which authors provide their personal view on the current status and future direction of the research discussed. The journal was established as Current Opinion on Therapeutic Patents in 1991, and changed to the current name in 1994. It is published by Informa. The editor-in-chief is Claudiu T. Supuran (University of Florence).

Abstracting and indexing 
The journal is abstracted and indexed in Chemical Abstracts Service, Current Contents/Life Sciences, EMBASE/Excerpta Medica, Index Medicus/Medline/PubMed, and the Science Citation Index Expanded. According to the Journal Citation Reports, the journal has a 2014 impact factor of 4.297.

References

External links 
 

Pharmaceutical industry
Expert Opinion journals
Pharmacology journals
Monthly journals
English-language journals
Publications established in 1991